Jennifer Louise Rochon (born 1970) is an American lawyer who is serving as a United States district judge of the United States District Court for the Southern District of New York. From 2013 to 2022, she was general counsel of the Girl Scouts of the USA.

Early life and education 
Rochon was born in St. Clair, Michigan. She earned a Bachelor of Arts from the University of Michigan in 1992 and a Juris Doctor from the New York University School of Law in 1997.

Career 
From 1992 to 1994, Rochon worked as a volunteer with the Peace Corps. From 1997 to 2000, Rochon served as a law clerk for Judge Maryanne Trump Barry of the United States District Court for the District of New Jersey and United States Court of Appeals for the Third Circuit. Rochon was an associate at Kramer Levin Naftalis & Frankel from 2000 to 2006 and a partner from 2006 to 2013. Rochon represented immigration organizations as amici in constitutional challenges to the Immigration and Nationality Act. From 2013 to 2022, she worked as General Counsel for Girl Scouts of the USA.

Federal judicial service 
On December 15, 2021, President Joe Biden nominated Rochon to serve as a United States district judge of the United States District Court for the Southern District of New York. President Biden nominated Rochon to the seat vacated by Judge George B. Daniels, who assumed senior status on May 1, 2021. On February 1, 2022, a hearing on her nomination was held before the Senate Judiciary Committee. On March 10, 2022, her nomination was reported out of committee by a 12–10 vote. On May 17, 2022, the United States Senate invoked cloture on her nomination by a 51–47 vote. On May 18, 2022, her nomination was confirmed by a 51–47 vote. She received her judicial commission on June 13, 2022.

References

External links 
 

1970 births
Living people
20th-century American women lawyers
20th-century American lawyers
21st-century American judges
21st-century American women lawyers
21st-century American lawyers
21st-century American women judges
Judges of the United States District Court for the Southern District of New York
New York (state) lawyers
New York University School of Law alumni
Peace Corps volunteers
People from St. Clair, Michigan
United States district court judges appointed by Joe Biden
University of Michigan alumni